Orman is a town in the municipality of Gjorče Petrov, North Macedonia.

Demographics
As of the 2021 census, Orman had 546 residents with the following ethnic composition:
Macedonians 481
Persons for whom data are taken from administrative sources 35
Serbs 22
Others 8

According to the 2002 census, the village had a total of 461 inhabitants. Ethnic groups in the village include:
Macedonians 418
Serbs 28
Romani 2
Others 13

References

External links

Villages in Ǵorče Petrov Municipality